Saulius Mikoliūnas (born 2 May 1984) is a Lithuanian professional footballer who plays as a right winger for Žalgiris Vilnius and the Lithuania national team. He has previously played for Scottish Premier League club Heart of Midlothian and Ukrainian Premier League club Arsenal Kyiv. With 101 caps, Mikoliūnas is also the Lithuania national team's most-capped player.

Club career

In January 2005, Mikoliūnas moved to Scottish club Heart of Midlothian on loan from FBK Kaunas. He was a regular in the first team for the hearts, however inconsistency always dogged his Hearts career. He silenced many critics with the winner at Tynecastle versus city rivals Hibernian on 26 December 2006. Mikoliūnas announced on 2 December 2008 that he wanted to leave the Edinburgh club after the 2008–09 season, to take up a new football challenge after spending four years at the club. On 27 April 2009, it was confirmed with immediate effect that the midfielder and his Lithuanian colleague Deividas Česnauskis had left Hearts.

The following month, Mikoliūnas stated he was to sign for Swansea City on a free transfer during the summer transfer window, but the move broke down after Swansea manager Roberto Martínez moved to Wigan Athletic. Eventually, Mikoliūnas signed a three-year contract with Ukrainian side Arsenal Kyiv.

In January 2013, Mikoliūnas moved to Ukrainian First League side FC Sevastopol. At the end of the season, his team achieved promotion to the Ukrainian Premier League. In August 2014, he signed for Belarusian club Shakhtyor Soligorsk.

In December 2015, Lithuanian club Žalgiris Vilnius announced that Mikoliūnas will move to the club for the 2016 season. Since then, he has appeared in more than 150 games for Žalgiris, won the A Lyga title three times, and lifted the Lithuanian cup four times with his team.

On 9 May 2019, Mikoliūnas received a UEFA B coaching license.

International career
Mikoliūnas made his debut for the Lithuania national team in 2004 in a friendly match against Portugal, and scored his first international goal in 2007 against Georgia. He followed that up a year later with a second goal against Romania. On 9 October 2014, in a UEFA Euro 2016 qualifying match, he scored the most recent goal of his five international goals, against Estonia in a 1–0 home victory.

After appearing in a Nations League match against Kazakhstan on 4 September 2020, Mikoliūnas attained his 85th cap for his country and thus became the most capped player for Lithuania, surpassing previous record holder Andrius Skerla. On 25 September 2022, he became the first Lithuanian player to reach 100 caps for the national team after playing in the Nations League match against Luxembourg.

Position
Mikoliūnas is a right-sided winger who sometimes plays in the right-back position.

Career statistics
Scores and results list Lithuania's goal tally first, score column indicates score after each Mikoliūnas goal.

Honours
FBK Kaunas
 Lithuanian A Lyga: 2004
 Lithuanian Cup: 2004
 Lithuanian Super Cup: 2004

Hearts FC
 Scottish Cup: 2005–06

FK Žalgiris
 Lithuanian A Lyga: 2016, 2020, 2021
 Lithuanian Cup: 2016, 2018, 2021, 2022
 Lithuanian Super Cup: 2016, 2017, 2020

References

External links

Hearts Appearances at londonhearts.com

1984 births
Living people
Lithuanian footballers
Association football midfielders
Association football wingers
Lithuania international footballers
Lithuanian expatriate footballers
Expatriate footballers in Scotland
Expatriate footballers in Ukraine
Expatriate footballers in Belarus
Lithuanian expatriate sportspeople in Scotland
Lithuanian expatriate sportspeople in Ukraine
Lithuanian expatriate sportspeople in Belarus
A Lyga players
Scottish Premier League players
Ukrainian Premier League players
Belarusian Premier League players
FC Vilnius players
FK Ekranas players
FBK Kaunas footballers
Heart of Midlothian F.C. players
FC Arsenal Kyiv players
FC Sevastopol players
FC Shakhtyor Soligorsk players
FK Žalgiris players
FIFA Century Club